The United Restoration Army was the military body formed in 1837 by the alliance of the land and naval forces of the Republic of Chile and the Restoration Army of Peru, formed in 1836 by Peruvian soldiers opposed to the Peru-Bolivian Confederation. Manuel Bulnes Prieto was appointed as its general in chief.

Among its members were the North Peruvian military and politicians Antonio Gutiérrez de La Fuente and Ramón Castilla, among others, who were exiled in Chile. There were also General Manuel Ignacio de Vivanco, Andrés Martínez and the politician Felipe Pardo y Aliaga, who negotiated the deal with Chile to intervene in favor of the North-Peruvian State, joining forces in order to break the Confederation. Likewise, former North Peruvian president Agustín Gamarra and his followers were also refugees, who finally formed the United Restoration Army in Chile. After the war, the military campaigns were paid by Peru to the government of Chile.

The defeat of the Peru-Bolivian Confederation occurred in the town of Villa de Yungay, in the Department of Huaylas on January 20, 1839. In commemoration of this victory, the Department of Huaylas took the name of the Department of Ancash, as it is known today.

Later the term was used again during the Peruvian revolutions where one of the parties called restoration to the cause they defended, such was the case of the revolution led by General Mariano Ignacio Prado in 1865.

See also
Restoration Army of Peru

References

External links
 Disponiendo que el departamento de Huaylas se denomine Ancash
 Determinando la medalla que debe darse a los vencedores de Ancach

Military history of Peru
War of the Confederation
Military units and formations established in 1837